Michel Pouzol (born 5 July 1962) is a French politician, who was the former Deputy for the Third Constituency of Essonne from 17 June 2012 to 20 June 2017. Pouzol is a member of the Socialist Party.

Biography
Pouzol was born on 5 July 1962 in Clermont-Ferrand.

References

External links
 Official biography
Michel Pouzol on Twitter

French politicians
Living people
1962 births